Islamic Senior High School is an educational institution located in Abrepo, a suburb of Kumasi in the Ashanti Region of Ghana.

References 

Education in Ghana
High schools in Ghana